John Costas may refer to:

 John Costas (Greek revolutionary) (1868–1932), Greek revolutionary and volunteer during Second Boer War.
 John P. Costas (engineer) (1923–2008), American engineer, invented the Costas loop and Costas arrays
 John P. Costas (business) (born 1957), American businessman, former head of UBS Investment Bank and Dillon Read Capital Management